The Draining Lake (Icelandic: Kleifarvatn) is a 2004 crime novel by Icelandic author Arnaldur Indriðason, an entry in the Detective Erlendur series.

The title is based on a real Icelandic lake Kleifarvatn, which began draining away in 2000 following an earthquake. In the novel, the dropping water level reveals a body long hidden in the lake.

Awards and honors
2009 Macavity Award: Nominee

References

2004 novels
Novels by Arnaldur Indriðason
Novels set in Iceland
Barry Award-winning works